The Padungan River is a river in Sarawak, Malaysia. It is a tributary to the Sarawak River, and flows through Kuching.

References

Rivers of Sarawak
Rivers of Malaysia